José García Quesada (7 May 1931 – 12 May 2013) was a Chilean footballer.  He competed in the men's tournament at the 1952 Summer Olympics.

References

External links
 
 
 José García at Olympics.com

1931 births
2013 deaths
Chilean footballers
Chile international footballers
Olympic footballers of Chile
Footballers at the 1952 Summer Olympics
Place of birth missing
Association football midfielders
Naval de Talcahuano footballers
Club Deportivo Palestino footballers
Chilean Primera División players